Midnight at Minton's is an album by jazz musician Don Byas, first released in 1973. It is a live recording of a 1941 jam session at Minton's Playhouse, the New York City nightclub at which the emerging style of bebop was being pioneered.

It features one of the earliest known recordings of Thelonious Monk, who was then playing piano in Minton's house band.

The album is taken from private recordings made by Columbia University student Jerry Newman on a portable acetate disc recorder. Newman made the recordings for "Delayed on Disc" broadcasts on college radio station WKCR — the discs were rushed back to the radio studio shortly after being cut and presented in the style of a live broadcast from the venue.
 
In a review for AllMusic, Michael G. Nastos concludes that, "the music itself is priceless, the document of a transitional period from swing to bop, and some of the people that made it happen, especially the underappreciated genius Byas."

Track listing 
 "Stardust" (Hoagy Carmichael, Mitchell Parish) – 9:04
 "Exactly Like You" (Dorothy Fields, Jimmy McHugh) – 9:03
 "Uptown" (Don Byas) – 2:45
 "Body and Soul" (Edward Heyman, Robert Sour, Frank Eyton, Johnny Green) – 7:29
 "I Can't Give You Anything But Love" (Fields, McHugh) – 4:07
 "(Back Home Again in) Indiana" (James F. Hanley, Ballard MacDonald) – 6:23

Personnel 
 Don Byas – tenor saxophone
 Joe Guy – trumpet
 Thelonious Monk – piano
 Kenny Clarke – drums
 Helen Humes – vocals (1,2)

Similar albums 
 Live at Minton's – Musidisc 30 JA 5121 (France, LP)
 Midnight at Minton's – Onyx ORI 208 (LP)
 Midnight at Minton's – Polydor 2310341 (LP)

References 

1999 live albums
Don Byas albums
HighNote Records live albums
Albums recorded at WKCR-FM